Morgan's Christmas Raid was carried out by Confederate Brigadier General John Hunt Morgan between December 22, 1862, and January 5, 1863. Morgan's intention was to cut the supply lines to the Union Army of the Cumberland in Tennessee. Morgan's 4,000-strong cavalry force left Alexandria, Tennessee, on December 22 and passed into Kentucky on Christmas Eve, defeating part of the 2nd Michigan Cavalry Regiment near Tompkinsville. On Christmas Day they fought and defeated an Indiana cavalry detachment at Bear Wallow, Barren County. The Union sent forces under Colonel John Marshall Harlan and Major General Joseph J. Reynolds to try to catch Morgan, though Morgan used ruses to distract his pursuers. Morgan captured a Union stockade at Bonnieville on December 26 and on December 27 captured Elizabethtown before burning the bridges at Muldraugh's Hill.

Harlan's men found part of Morgan's force near Boston on December 29.  Despite being outnumbered the Confederate commander, Colonel Basil W. Duke, attacked the Union forces, delaying them long enough to allow his men to escape across the Rolling Fork River.  Morgan returned to Tennessee via Bardstown, New Haven and Springfield.  He bypassed a Union force at Lebanon on December 30 and burnt a stockade at Tebbs' Bend.  The raid ended with his arrival at Smithville, Tennessee, on January 5, 1863.

Morgan's men covered  in the raid, killed or wounded 150 Union soldiers and captured more than 1,800.  He had also caused more than $2 million in damage to Union infrastructure, including the railroad.  In return Morgan suffered losses of just 2 men killed, 24 wounded and 64 missing.  The raid has been described as "arguably Morgan's most successful foray of the war".

Background 
The Union had invaded Tennessee in early 1862, with Nashville being captured by the Army of the Cumberland under Major General Don Carlos Buell in February and Memphis in June.  Confederate forces were thereafter confined to the eastern and middle portions of the state. Neighbouring Kentucky had declared neutrality at the start of the war but moved to the Union after a Confederate invasion by Major General Leonidas Polk in September 1861.

Confederate cavalry commander, Colonel John Hunt Morgan had carried out raids from Tennessee into Kentucky in 1862, recruiting volunteers from among Confederate sympathisers there.  He was keen to hinder Union supply lines to the Army of the Cumberland in Tennessee and burnt the railway tunnels at Gallatin.  Whilst operating on the Union lines of communications Morgan defeated a superior Union force at the December 7 Battle of Hartsville, capturing more than 1,800 troops.

The Louisville and Nashville Railroad was a key logistical lifeline to Union forces in Tennessee.  Newly promoted to Brigadier General Morgan proposed a raid into Kentucky to damage this railroad.  His superior officer, General Braxton Bragg, gave his permission for the raid to take place.

Raid 

On the eve of the raid, December 21, Morgan gathered his troops for review.  He spoke to them of the dangerous nature of the task ahead and warned that some among them "would find a grave before the expedition was over". Morgan's 4,000-strong force of cavalry, largely drawn from Kentucky regiments, with seven artillery pieces, left Alexandria, Tennessee, on December 22.  Due to shortages of weapons some of Morgan's men were unarmed, though the force carried three days' of rations. Around 400 of Morgan's men were Stovepipe Johnson's partisan cavalry; Morgan followed Bragg's advice to integrate them into regular cavalry formations rather than allow them free hand to roam the countryside.

Having progressed  Morgan's men passed into Kentucky on Christmas Eve, near Tompkinsville.  There they defeated an advanced guard of the 2nd Michigan Cavalry Regiment before proceeding to Glasgow.  On Christmas Day Morgan's force attacked and defeated some companies of the 4th and 5th Indiana Cavalry Regiment at Bear Wallow, Barren County, taking most of the Union force prisoner.

The Union command under Major General George Henry Thomas made efforts to pursue Morgan. On Christmas Day Thomas ordered John Marshall Harlan to travel by rail from Gallatin to search for Morgan's men and prevent him from progressing to Louisville. Harlan commanded around 3,000 men from his brigade plus a detachment of the 11th Kentucky Infantry Regiment and some artillery. Harlan's men were hampered by a faulty locomotive and disembarked at Munfordville. Major General Joseph J. Reynolds' division was also deployed to the area in an attempt to safeguard the railroad.

Morgan made attempts to distract his pursuers, with former telegrapher George Ellsworth tapping into Union telegraph lines to send misleading messages. He also split his force with a detachment sent to Bacon Creek Bridge near Bonnieville.  This party captured a Union stockade and took 100 soldiers prisoner on December 26.  With the remainder of his force Morgan moved north and, on December 27, defeated the 91st Illinois Volunteer Infantry Regiment at Elizabethtown, taking 650 prisoners.

Morgan's force proceeded towards Muldraugh, tearing up and destroying the railroad tracks as they went. The force reached Muldraugh's Hill and overran the defensive stockades protecting the two bridges, taking another 700 prisoners (including 27 officers).

A party of Harlan's 11th Kentuckians discovered some of Morgan's men, numbering around 800 cavalry, at rest by the Rolling Fork River near Boston on December 29. The Confederate commander, Colonel Basil W. Duke, was at that time conducting a court martial.  He ordered a withdrawal across the river before being wounded in the head by a shell explosion.  Union artillery fire prevented a crossing until Duke's men counterattacked the 2,300-strong Union force and silenced the artillery, allowing a withdrawal.

Harlan, wary that Morgan might attempt to burn the nearby railroad bridge across the Rolling Fork, did not pursue. Morgan's men then made their way back towards Tennessee.  They proceeded via Bardstown, New Haven and Springfield. A Union force prevented his passing through Lebanon on December 30, so Morgan bypassed the town at night. Heavy snow fell from December 30, which hindered Morgan's progress. Morgan continued via Campbellsville and Tebbs' Bend, where he burnt a stockade and a bridge crossing the Green River.  His raid ended with his arrival at Smithville, Tennessee, on January 5, 1863.

Morgan's men had covered  in the raid. They had killed or wounded 150 Union soldiers and captured more than 1,800, many of whom had been paroled. Morgan's force suffered 2 men killed, 24 wounded and 64 missing (some of the wounded and missing later rejoined their units).

Impact 

Former Virginia Military Institute military history professor Spencer C. Tucker has described the raid as "arguably Morgan's most successful foray of the war".  The raid provided Morgan with large quantities of captured stores and good quality weapons sufficient to arm his entire force. However former West Point Academy history lecturer Robert R. Mackey considers that the importance of the raid has been overstated.  He contends that Major General William Rosecrans, in charge of the Army of the Ohio, had anticipated such a raid might occur and stockpiled, in anticipation, stores sufficient to supply his army for three months.  Winter rainfall had also swelled the Cumberland River allowing Rosecrans to receive supplies by boat rather than rail. Although work on repairing the railroad bridges did not commence until March 1863 Rosecrans' supply lines had generally reached pre-raid capacity by February 1.

The raid diverted 7,300 Union soldiers from the December 31 – January 2 Battle of Stones River where Bragg fought and was defeated by Rosecrans. It also prevented Morgan from being present at the battle, depriving Bragg of an important means of reconnaissance. After the raid the Union committed more than 20,000 soldiers to static defence in the Western Theater, in an attempt to prevent a recurrence.

See also 
Morgan's Raid of June–July 1863

References 

Cavalry raids of the American Civil War
Military operations of the American Civil War in Kentucky
Military operations of the American Civil War in Tennessee
December 1862 events
January 1863 events
1862 in Tennessee
1863 in Tennessee
1862 in Kentucky
1863 in Kentucky
Stones River Campaign
Battles of the Western Theater of the American Civil War
Louisville and Nashville Railroad